Barrio Fino World Tour was a concert tour by reggaeton singer Daddy Yankee to promote his third studio album, Barrio Fino (2004). This was his first large tour and his first arena tour in the United States and was the first reggaeton act to do so. The tour visited Latin America and United States and consisted of three legs. In December 2005, Yankee released Barrio Fino en Directo with featured videos and songs recorded live on this tour. Also, contained a DVD with footage of the tour in Colombia, Puerto Rico, Ecuador and Dominican Republic.

Background 
Barrio Fino became the first reggaeton album to hit platinum in the United States and selling over 1.5 million copies worldwide in its first year of release, along with the hit single "Gasolina", which is credited with introducing reggaeton to the mainstream. To promote the album, Daddy Yankee in a series of promotional presentations and embark in his first extensive world tour, including his first arena tour in the United States and the first reggaeton artist to do so.

The tour was the first arena tour by a reggaeton act in the United States. Because of this, high expectations were created around the beginning of the tour. Augustin Gurza from Los Angeles Times wrote and article titled  "Yankee is coming, and coming strong; Daddy Yankee's solo U.S. tour could help solidify commercial appeal of reggaeton". On the article he stated. "If Yankee succeeds as a solo headline attraction, he will establish the commercial appeal of the genre. Observers say Yankee's success could open doors for other artists and encourage continued collaborations with mainstream English-language hip-hop stars, a linkage seen as crucial to reggaeton's future".

Overview 
The tour a were massive success across Latin American. On December 13, 2004 Daddy Yankee Become the first artist ever to have a concert in the Coliseo de Puerto Rico. The October 16, 2005 concert in Santo Domingo it was part of the Festival Presidente de la musica Latina 2005 with a record attendance and was televised live. Some scenes of both were part of his latter release Barrio Fino en Directo.

During the United States Leg, the tour was renamed ¿Who's your Daddy? Tour. It officially kick off on August 27, 2005. Ticket prices were between $45 to $100 dollars. The February 17, 2006  concert in Miami was First Ever Nationally Televised Reggaeton Concert in the United States by pay per view. Following the success Barrio Fino en Directo, more dates in latin america was added.

The February 26, 2006 concert in Valparaíso, Chile was part  of the Viña del Mar International Song Festival, becoming the first reggaeton ever to perform in that stage and it was broadcast live. It was widely recognized as one of the best urban performances in the history of the festival. He later came back in the 2009 and 2013 editions. Due to the success of Barrio Fino en Directo, a Latin American Leg was announced. The concert in Tegucigalpa had an attendance of 25,000 fans according to the local media. Also, around 90,000 fans in the Evento 40 2006 Festival performance in Ciudad de Mexico, Estadio Azteca concert and Zapopan 13,000. According to some media, 18,000 fans attended the Costa Rica concert at Saprissa Stadium  while the Concert in Santiago de Chile was sold out with 13,000 ticket sold. In Nicaragua, the attendance was more than 20,000 fans.

Setlist

Tour Dates

Box office data

Notes

References

2004 concert tours
2005 concert tours
2006 concert tours
Daddy Yankee concert tours